Jakub Lauko (born 28 March 2000) is a Czech ice hockey center for the  Boston Bruins of the National Hockey League (NHL). The Bruins selected him in the third round (77th overall) of the 2018 NHL Entry Draft.

Playing career
After two seasons with Piráti Chomutov of the Czech Extraliga (ELH), Lauko was selected in the third round (77th overall) by the Boston Bruins in the 2018 NHL Entry Draft. On 28 September 2018, the Bruins signed him to a three-year, entry-level contract.

Lauko joined the Rouyn-Noranda Huskies of the Quebec Major Junior Hockey League (QMJHL) for the 2018–19 season. He recorded 41 points in 44 games. The Huskies defeated the Halifax Mooseheads in four games to win the President's Cup. Lauko finished the postseason with 13 points in 19 games. The Huskies then went on to capture the Memorial Cup. Lauko led the tournament in scoring with eight points in five games.

Lauko joined the Providence Bruins of the American Hockey League (AHL) for the 2019–20 season. On 7 December, he was stretchered off the ice in a game against the Utica Comets. After checking Comets' forward Justin Bailey, Lauko collapsed to the ice. However, he was able to give a thumbs-up whilst exiting the game. Lauko finished the season with nine points in 22 games.

On 17 August 2020, the Bruins loaned Lauko to HC Energie Karlovy Vary of the Czech Extraliga until the commencement of the delayed 2020–21 North American season. Lauko returned to Providence, playing 23 games and totalling 19 points in the shortened North American season.

Personal 
Lauko is of partial Ukrainian descent through his grandmother, who was from Lviv.

Career statistics

Regular season and playoffs

International

Awards and honors

References

External links
 

2000 births
Living people
Boston Bruins draft picks
Boston Bruins players
Czech ice hockey centres
HC Karlovy Vary players
Piráti Chomutov players
Providence Bruins players
Rouyn-Noranda Huskies players
Ice hockey people from Prague
Czech expatriate ice hockey players in Canada
Czech expatriate ice hockey players in the United States